The 2017 The Jewish Home leadership election was held on 27 April 2017 to elect the leader of The Jewish Home party. Incumbent leader Naftali Bennett won a strong reelection over two challengers.

Background
Bennett was first elected party leader in 2012 and was reelected in 2015.

In the 2013 Israeli legislative election, Bennett led the party to its strongest showing, with twelve Knesset seats. However, in 2015 (after Bennett was reelected party leader), the party lost seats, falling to eight seats. Ahead of the 2017 leadership election, polls showed the party receiving ten seats in future elections. The party was seen by many as underperforming compared to the where it had been originally anticipated that Bennett's leadership might bring it rise.

At the time of the leadership election, the next legislative election was not expected to occur until 2019. However, facing prospective leadership challenges, on 8 March 2017 Bennett scheduled for an early leadership election. One speculated reason for this was that it would give any opponents only about two months to mount their campaigns. Another speculated reason was that it could provide Benett a legal excuse to politically fundraise. Another speculated reason was that it would make a political statement that the party was anticipating that Prime Minister Benjamin Netanyahu would be ousted from power due to criminal investigations necessitating an early Knesset election.

Candidates
Naftali Bennett, incumbent party leader
Yonatan Branski, former Israel Defense Forces colonel
Yitzhak Zagha, rabbi and leader of the Spirit of Jerusalem

Campaign
Both of Bennett's challengers positioned themselves further to the political right than Bennett. They were characterized by The Times of Israel as "hard right".

By the time of the vote, Bennett was widely expected to win reelection as leader.

Electorate
The party's 30,734 members were eligible to vote at 69 polling stations located across the nation.

Results
Turnout was low, which some attributed to the overwhelming expectation that Bennett was going to win.

References

Jewish Home leadership
2017
Jewish Home
Jewish Home leadership election
2017 Jewish Home leadership election